Kate Morgan ( – 1892) was an American woman who died under mysterious circumstances, and is thought by locals to now haunt the Hotel del Coronado in Coronado, California. She was buried at nearby Mount Hope Cemetery in Division 5, Section 1.

Background
Kate Farmer was born in Fremont County, Iowa, around the year of 1864. Her mother died on September 23, 1865, and at the age of two, young Kate was sent to live with her maternal grandfather, Joe Chandler.

On November 9, 1870, Kate's father, George Washington Farmer, was appointed to be the Postmaster of Hamburg, Iowa. He remarried in  1871, fathered two more daughters and then moved to Texas, where he died in 1876.

On December 30, 1885, Kate married Thomas Edwin Morgan and they had one child, a boy, born on October 31, 1886; he lived only two days.

Around 1890, Kate Morgan ran off with Albert Allen, a stepson of Thomas' stepmother, Emily Dennison Allen Morgan.

This relationship also did not appear to have lasted. Although there are very few records of Morgan's life at this time, the next time she was reported sighted, she was ill and alone.

Her next appearance was at the Hotel del Coronado in 1892. She arrived on November 24, checking in under the name "Mrs. Lottie A. Bernard, Detroit." The staff reported that she seemed ladylike, beautiful, reserved and well-dressed, but troubled and very melancholy.

Death
Kate was found dead on November 29, 1892, on the exterior staircase of the Hotel del Coronado leading to the beach, of what was believed to be a self-inflicted gunshot wound to the head, but the bullet in her head didn't match the gun she had.  This was five days after checking into the hotel.  A San Francisco lawyer, Alan May, speculated in the 1980s that her death involved foul play. Evidence for the alleged homicide was a passing statement, during the coroner's inquest, that the bullet found in her head did not match that of her own gun. There are many theories as to how Kate Morgan died, however none have been confirmed.

Sightings 
There have been many putative ghost sightings, and other potential paranormal events at Hotel del Coronado since then. The official Hotel del Coronado website  even mentions the ghost.

The hotel's Heritage Department has published an official book on this subject, written by the hotel's professional historian, titled The Beautiful Stranger: The Ghost of Kate Morgan and The Hotel del Coronado. It avoids speculation in its research of historical documents available in local public libraries, historical societies, and university libraries as well as city hall and police files. The Heritage Department's book leans toward the official suicide verdict.

There are four other books available.  John T. Cullen has written two: his first, updated in 2008, Dead Move: Kate Morgan and the Haunting Mystery of Coronado, Second Edition, is a non-fiction account of the mystery. His second is Lethal Journey, a novel published in August 2009.

The third book is The Ghost of the Hotel del Coronado, The TRUE Story of Kate Morgan, by Terry Girardot. Kate's husband, Tom Morgan, was the half-brother of Girardot's maternal grandmother, and his book contains full versions of all articles from the San Diego, Los Angeles and San Francisco newspapers from that period, along with documents from his genealogy research, including the original telegram sent to Tom advising him of Kate's suicide. Tom's granddaughter provided him with the photograph of Kate seen on this page.

A fourth ghost story book is by the above mentioned lawyer Alan M. May.  Alan speculated that Kate did not kill herself, while also speculating that she may have been a daughter of one of his own ancestors.

References

1860s births
1892 deaths
Suicides by firearm in California
Deaths by firearm in California
People from Fremont County, Iowa
American ghosts
Burials at Mount Hope Cemetery (San Diego)
1890s suicides